This list is of the Cultural Properties of Japan designated in the category of  for the Prefecture of Kanagawa.

National Cultural Properties
As of 1 August 2015, six Important Cultural Properties have been designated, being of national significance.

Prefectural Cultural Properties
As of September 2014, one property has been designated at a prefectural level.

See also
 Cultural Properties of Japan
 List of Historic Sites of Japan (Kanagawa)
 Sagami Province, Musashi Province
 Kanagawa Prefectural Museum of Cultural History
 List of National Treasures of Japan (historical materials)
 List of Cultural Properties of Japan - paintings (Kanagawa)

References

External links
  Cultural Properties in Kanagawa Prefecture
  List of Cultural Properties in Kanagawa Prefecture

Cultural Properties,historical materials
Historical materials,Kanagawa